The Virginia Slave Codes of 1705 (formally entitled An act concerning Servants and Slaves), were a series of laws enacted by the Colony of Virginia's House of Burgesses in 1705 regulating the interactions between slaves and citizens of the crown colony of Virginia. The enactment of the Slave Codes is considered to be the consolidation of slavery in Virginia, and served as the foundation of Virginia's slave legislation.

These codes effectively embedded the idea of slavery into law by the following devices:
 Established new property rights for slave owners
 Allowed for the legal, free trade of slaves with protections granted by the courts
 Established separate courts of trial
 Prohibited slaves from going armed, without written permission
 Whites could not be employed by any blacks
 Allowed for the apprehension of suspected runaways

The law was devised to establish a greater level of control over the rising African slave population of Virginia. It also served to socially segregate white colonists from black enslaved persons, making them disparate groups hindering their ability to unite.  A unity of the commoners was a perceived fear of the Virginia aristocracy which had to be addressed, and who wished to prevent a repeat of events such as Bacon's Rebellion, occurring 29 years prior.

See also
 The text of the act
 Slave codes
 Slavery in the United States
 Thomas Jefferson and slavery

Notes

Virginia law
Legal history of Virginia
United States slavery law
History of slavery in Virginia
1705 in Virginia
1705 in law